Chenoderus is a genus of beetles in the family Cerambycidae, containing the following species:

 Chenoderus bicolor Fairmaire & Germain, 1861
 Chenoderus testaceus (Blanchard in Gay, 1851)
 Chenoderus tricolor (Fairmaire & Germain, 1859)
 Chenoderus venustus Fairmaire & Germain, 1861

References

Unxiini